Pyramidella hancocki is a species of sea snail, a marine gastropod mollusk in the family Pyramidellidae, the pyrams and their allies.

Description
The length of the shell varies between 8 mm and 12 mm.

Distribution
This species occurs in the Pacific Ocean off Panama Bay.

References

External links
 To World Register of Marine Species
 

Pyramidellidae
Gastropods described in 1939